Crashing is a 2007 American drama film directed by Gary Walkow and starring Campbell Scott, Lizzy Caplan, Izabella Miko and Alex Kingston. It is a follow-up to Walkow's 1987 film The Trouble with Dick.  The Russo brothers served as executive producers of the film.

Cast
Campbell Scott as Richard McMurray
Lizzy Caplan as Jacqueline 
Izabella Miko as Kristin
Alex Kingston as Diane Freed
David Cross as Space Station Man
Stephen Gyllenhaal as Writer

Release
The film premiered at the Gen Art Film Festival on April 11, 2007.

Reception
Todd McCarthy of Variety gave the film a positive review and wrote, "...insidiously engaging low-budgeter employs a literate sensibility, breezy tone and warm performances..."

References

External links
 
 

2000s English-language films